Israel Standard Time (IST) (lit. "Clock of Israel") is the standard time zone in Israel. It is two hours ahead of UTC (UTC+02:00).

Overview

History
At the beginning of the British Mandate, the time zone of the mandate area (present-day Israel and Jordan), was set to Cairo's time zone, which is two hours ahead of Greenwich Mean Time. The unique "Israel Standard Time" came into effect with the founding of the State of Israel in 1948, which gave Israel the authority in determining its own time, specifically to enact daylight saving time.

Differences between other countries
The offset from UTC is equivalent to Eastern European Time (UTC+02:00), during most of the year. Because Israel switches to summer time on Friday, rather than Sunday as most other countries do, the change of time in spring occurs either two days before or five days after the switch to summer time in Europe. The switch on Friday is due to having the Jewish Sabbath as the common rest day of the week. Prior to 2013, Israel Daylight Time ended earlier in autumn, and the time was identical to Central European Summer Time for between two and seven weeks during these months.

Israel shares the UTC+02:00 time offset with all of its neighbouring countries: Egypt, Lebanon and part of Syria.

Daylight saving time

Israel observes daylight saving time, locally called Israel Summer Time (sometimes abbreviated in English as IDT).

Since July 2013, IDT begins on the Friday before the last Sunday of March, and ends on the last Sunday of October.

See also
Israel Summer Time
Daylight saving time

References

Time zones
Time in Israel

he:אזור זמן#אזור הזמן של ישראל